Łęczycans is an ethnographic group of Polish people that originate from the historical region of Łęczyca Land, located within borders of the Łódź Voivodeship, Poland. The group currently does not express much cultural separateness from other Poles. Historically, the group has been heavily inflected by the neighboring groups of Masovians, Greater Poland people, and Lesser Poland People.

Notes

References 

Leczycans
Leczycans
Leczycans
Leczycans
Leczycans
Leczycans